The Kraken Regiment is a Ukrainian military volunteer unit, part of the spetsnaz units of the Main Directorate of Intelligence of Ukraine (HUR) formed on 24 February 2022, the same day as the Russian invasion of Ukraine. 

Named after the mythical sea creature, the regiment was formed by veterans of the Azov Regiment and has successfully liberated several occupied villages during the fighting, later also taking part in counter offensives and sabotage operations, becoming one of the more high-profile volunteer units in the war.

History
In April 2022, the unit dismantled the monument to Marshal Georgy Zhukov in Kharkiv. In late September, it was reported that Nemichev claimed the unit had captured more than 15 Russian officers, handing them over to the Main Intelligence Directorate. He was quoted saying “All of them were thrown into the infantry. Therefore, it is indicative that Russians have big problems now. They do not know where to get people to send to death. Therefore, they gather them in different units and deploy them here. So they’re not doing well as it is, and then we come along and ‘spoil the mood’ some more.”

Also in September, the regiment was reported to have played a key role in recapturing Izium. In late December, the Main Directorate of Intelligence published a video showing Kraken along with the 92nd Separate Mechanized Brigade carrying out an assault on Novoselivske, successfully removing the Russian forces in the settlement and inflicting losses upon Russian equipment and personnel. In January 2023, 
the president of Ukraine Volodymyr Zelenskyy personally thanked the regiment for their work fighting enemies in the Soledar region.

In March 2023, Kraken announced the destruction of a Russian observation tower in Bryansk Oblast through the use of a kamikaze drone. The unit posted a video of the operation showing the tower being destroyed, though did not specify exactly when it took place.

Leadership
The commander of the regiment, Konstantin V. Nemichev, is a military and political figure in Kharkiv, member of the National Corps and veteran of the Azov Battalion, with many of his supporters joining the unit.

Members
Like the Azov Regiment, the Kraken Regiment has also been the subject of controversy surrounding recruitment of fighters from far-right groups, though the soldiers of the unit reject the claim as Russian propaganda. Commanders in the unit acknowledged that it is possible that far-right individuals are members in the regiment, but said such people are outnumbered by a diverse group with the intent to defend Ukraine. Kraken is not officially part of the Armed Forces of Ukraine, but answers to the Defense Ministry.

The unit is said to be composed of "gym rats", "ultras" and bouncers, while also having drawn in experienced combat veterans of ages varying between 25 and 60. The morale of the regiment has been described as high.

Equipment
Kraken has published media showcasing their use of Western small arms weaponry, including Austrian Glock pistols, Belgian Scar rifles, American M4A1 assault rifles, DD MK18's, Swiss B&T submachine guns, and lightweight multi-shot RBG6 hand grenade launchers made in Croatia.

See also 
 Ukrainian Volunteer Corps
 Skala Battalion

References 

Military units and formations of the 2022 Russian invasion of Ukraine
Military units and formations established in 2022
Far-right politics in Ukraine
Ministry of Defence (Ukraine)
Special forces of Ukraine
Regiments of Ukraine